Dinos de Saltillo (English: Saltillo Dinos) are an American football team based in Saltillo, Mexico. The Dinos compete in the Liga de Fútbol Americano Profesional, the top American football league in Mexico. The team plays its home games at the Estadio Francisco I. Madero.

History
The team was founded on 28 September 2016, in resemblance of the semi-professional team with the same name that played in the Mexican Master Football League from 1995 to 1996 in the city of Saltillo.

The team participated in the Liga de Fútbol Americano Profesional for the first time in the 2017 season. Under head coach  Guillermo Ruiz Burguete, the team finished with a 2–5 record, nevertheless, due to the competition system, Dinos still classified for playoffs and defeated Raptors for the North Division championship, classifying for the Tazón México in their first year in the league. The Dinos lost the Tazón México to the Mayas 18–24, played at the Estadio Jesús Martínez "Palillo" in Mexico City.

A new coaching staff arrived to the team for the 2018 season, led by head coach Carlos Cabral. The Dinos had a 4–3 regular season record, qualifying to the playoffs for second consecutive season, this time as division leader. In a rematch of the 2017 game, Dinos lost 6–21 to Raptors in the Division Championship game.

Javier Adame era (2019–present)
In May 2018, Dinos signed Javier Adame as head coach, ahead of the 2019 season. Adame had previously worked as offensive line coordinator for the Dinos.

From its inception until 2021, the Dinos played their home games at the Estadio Olímpico Francisco I. Madero. In 2022, due to an agreement between the Dinos and the baseball club Saraperos de Saltillo of the Mexican League, the team moved to the Estadio Francisco I. Madero.

In the 2022 season, the Dinos had finished with the best record in the regular season. In the playoffs, Saltillo had faced Gallos Negros, who defeated them.

Rivals

Fundidores de Monterrey
The Fundidores and the Dinos are from northern Mexico and divisional rivals since the establishment of the divisional system in the LFA in 2017. Besides that, the rivalry dates back to the times of the Liga Nacional de Futbol Americano (National American Football League) in the late 90s, when both cities (Saltillo and Monterrey) had fierce matches between their two teams: the Dinosaurios (Dinosaurs) and the Cerveceros (Brewers). The rivalry goes beyond the gridiron, since both teams fight season after season to get the best college players from Nuevo León and Coahuila.

Raptors de Naucalpan
The Raptors de Naucalpan and the Dinos play each season the so-called Jurassic Duel (Spanish: Duelo Jurásico). Due to these teams being two of the strongest in the league in recent years, this rivalry is considered amongst LFA's most important rivalries.

Roster

Staff

Season-by-season

Awards
 North Division
 Champions (1): (2017)

References

2016 establishments in Mexico
American football teams established in 2016
Saltillo
Sports teams in Coahuila
Liga de Fútbol Americano Profesional teams